Qasr-e Molla (also Romanized as Qaşr-e Mollā) is a village in Beyza Rural District, Beyza District, Sepidan County, Fars Province, Iran. At the 2006 census, its population was 191, in 47 families.

References 

Populated places in Beyza County